Ulrike Draesner (born 1962 in Munich) is a German author. She was awarded the 2016 Nicolas Born Prize.

Life and work
The daughter of an architect, Draesner grew up in Munich, Germany. She read Law, English and German literature as well as Philosophy in Munich, Salamanca, and Oxford. She worked as a lecturer Institute for German Philology from 1989 to 1993. In 1992, she received her doctorate for a dissertation on the Middle High German romance Parzival.

In 1993, Draesner quit her academic career in order to work as a full-time author. She has lived in Berlin since 1994, writing both poetry and prose. Her novel Vorliebe (2010) is a romance novel. In 2014, her groundbreaking novel Sieben Sprünge vom Rand der Welt was published and a celebrated success. Draesner frequently collaborates in cross-media projects with other artists and merges literature with sculpting, performing arts, and music. She became a member of the PEN Centre Germany in 1999. In 2010, she was elected to a Fellowship at the North Rhine-Westphalian Academy of Sciences, Humanities and the Arts. She is a regular guest at international literary festivals, and currently (2018) serves on the prize jury at the Irseer Pegasus. Her work has been translated into numerous languages.

During the academic year 2015/16, Draesner will be a visiting fellow at New College, Oxford, working with Karen Leeder, leader of the Mediating Modernity project, on topics of bilingualism, poetry translation and negotiating identity as a Writer in residence at the Faculty for Medieval and Modern Languages at the University of Oxford. A symposium on her and her work is planned for April 2016.

Publications 
 Single author titles
 Wege durch erzählte Welten. Intertextuelle Verweise als Mittel der Bedeutungskonstitution in Wolframs Parzival, dissertation, Frankfurt am Main [u.a.] 1993.
 Gedächtnisschleifen, poetry, Frankfurt am Main 1995, revised edition Munich 2008.
 Anis-o-trop, poetry, Hamburg 1997.
 Lichtpause, novel, poetry 1998.
 Reisen unter den Augenlidern, short stories, Klagenfurt 1999.
 für die nacht geheuerte zellen, poetry, München 2001.
 Bläuliche Sphinx, Berlin 2002 (with Lothar Seruset).
 Mitgift, novel, Munich 2002.
 Hot Dogs, short stories, Munich 2004.
 kugelblitz, poetry, Munich 2005.
 Spiele, novel, Munich 2005.
 Schöne Frauen lesen, essays, Luchterhand, Munich 2007, .
 berührte orte, poetry, Luchterhand, Munich 2008, .
 Vorliebe, novel, Luchterhand, Munich 2010, .
 Richtig liegen. Geschichten in Paaren, short stories, Luchterhand, Munich 2011, .
 Heimliche Helden. Über Heinrich von Kleist, James Joyce, Thomas Mann, Gottfried Benn, Karl Valentin u.v.a., Luchterhand, Munich 2013, .
 Sieben Sprünge vom Rand der Welt, novel, Luchterhand, Munich 2014, .

 Editor
 Verführung – Novellen von Goethe bis Musil, Munich 1994

 Literary translations
 Louise Glück: Wilde Iris, Munich 2008.
 Louise Glück: Averno, Munich 2007.
 Charles Simmons: Belles Lettres, Munich 2003 (translated with Klaus Modick).
 William Shakespeare: Twin spin, Göttingen 2000.
 Gertrude Stein: The first reader, Klagenfurt 2001.

Awards (selection) 
 1994 Literary Scholararship awarded by the City of Munich
 1995 Advancement award: Leonce-und-Lena-Preis
 1997 Foglio-Preis für Junge Literatur
 1997 Bayerischer Staatsförderpreis für Literatur
 2001 Award Künstlerhaus Edenkoben
 2001 Advancement award: Friedrich-Hölderlin-Preis of the City of Bad Homburg
 2002 Preis der Literaturhäuser
 2006 Droste-Preis der Stadt Meersburg
 2006 Professor of Poetry at the University of Bamberg
 2010 Solothurner Literaturpreis
 2012 Grenzgänger-Recherchestipendium der Robert Bosch Stiftung für Sieben Sprünge vom Rand der Welt
 2013 Roswitha-Preis
 2014 
 2014 Longlist beim Deutschen Buchpreis mit Sieben Sprünge vom Rand der Welt
 2016 Nicolas Born Prize

References

Further reading 
 Stephanie Catani, Friedhelm Marx (eds.): Familien – Geschlechter – Macht – Beziehungen im Werk Ulrike Draesners, Wallstein Verlag, 2008, 161 S. 
 Cornelia Saxe: Schöne Frauen lesen und schreiben – Die Ulrike-Draesner-Homestory, In: „Dünn ist die Decke der Zivilisation – Begegnungen zwischen Schriftstellerinnen“, Maike Stein (eds.), Ulrike Helmer Verlag, Frankfurt/M., 2007, S. 21 – 32, 
 Susanna Brogi (et al.), Text+Kritik, no. 201, "Ulrike Draesner", Munich 2014 (features various essays on her work)

External links 

 
 Ulrike Draesner bei der Nordrhein-Westfälischen Akademie der Wissenschaften und der Künste
 Ulrike Draesner, bachmannpreis.orf.at
 Link collection, University Library of the Free University of Berlin
 
 Kunst als Wissenschaft: Ulrike Draesner
 Ulrike Draesner, literature portal Bavaria

German women writers
1962 births
Living people